Dasysphaera is a genus of plants in the amaranth family, Amaranthaceae and is found in Africa distributed in north-east and east tropical Africa.

The genus has four accepted species:

 Dasysphaera alternifolia Chiov.
 Dasysphaera hyposericea (Chiov.) C.C.Townsend
 Dasysphaera robecchii Lopr.
 Dasysphaera tomentosa Lopr.

References

Flora of East Tropical Africa
Flora of Northeast Tropical Africa
 
Amaranthaceae genera